Still Blue is the second collaborative studio album by American singer-songwriter Jared Evan and producer Statik Selektah. The project was released on October 28, 2014. The album features guest appearances by Michael Christmas, Nyck Caution, Dessy Hinds and Ransom.

Track listing
All songs produced by Statik Selektah.

References

2014 albums
Statik Selektah albums
Albums produced by Statik Selektah
Collaborative albums